Valea Poienilor River may refer to:
 Valea Poienilor, a tributary of the Botiza in Maramureș County, Romania
 Valea Poienilor River (Siret), in Botoșani County, Romania